Wiman may refer to:

Wiman of Gojoseon (2nd century BC), the first ruler of Korea recorded in contemporary documents
Al Wiman, American reporter
Carl Wiman (1867–1944), Swedish paleontologist
David Wiman (1884–1950), Swedish gymnast
Dwight Deere Wiman (1895–1951), American; Broadway producer
Erastus Wiman (1834–1904), Canadian journalist and businessman
Matt Wiman (born 1983), American mixed martial arts fighter